John Lawrence "Jack" Canfora (born April 6, 1969) is an American playwright, actor, musician and teacher whose works include Place Setting, Jericho and  Poetic License.

Education and early career
After receiving his dramatic training at the London Academy of Music and Dramatic Art, he began his career as an actor in regional theater, working mostly in Shakespearean roles such as Mercutio and Macbeth as well appearing in the title roles in Hamlet, Gardner McKay's Toyer: An Unavoidable Tragedy, and in a 1995 production of "Variations on the Death of Trotsky".

Canfora has also performed on television for the educational series TV411. He also wrote for the show. His career as a writer began in the mid-1990s as a sketch writer for various New York-based sketch groups. After his sketch group "The Waiting Room" disbanded in 1999, he turned to playwriting, beginning with one-act comedies which were performed regionally in different parts of the United States.

Works

Place Setting
In September, 2005, his play Place Setting was read in Los Angeles, directed by veteran film director Howard Deutch and starring Jon Cryer and Steven Weber.

In June 2007, Canfora performed in Place Setting at the New Jersey Repertory Company. The play received largely positive reviews. Talkinbroadway.com said that while the play wasn't especially original, it did "provide witty, involving and thought provoking entertainment."  It also praised his performance in the role of Greg. Curtainup.com wrote "Canfora, who skillfully embraces both acting and writing, may not leave any of the characters unscarred or unscathed, but we are certainly kept alert and empathetic to their quandaries."  "The Newark Star-Ledger called the play "funny and fascinating," adding that "Canfora has wonderfully incisive wit". The Newark Star Ledger nominated "Place Setting" for "Best Play" for 2007-2008 along with plays by Edward Albee, Theresa Rebeck, and Elaine May.

In July, 2008, "Place Setting" had a public reading at the Soho Theatre in London, UK.

A World with Snow/Poetic License
In March 2005, his play A World with Snow was read publicly in New York City and starred Austin Pendleton.

In September, 2008, the New Jersey Repertory Company produced his play Poetic License (also known as A World with Snow) to largely mixed reviews. The New York Times wrote of the play and its characters "All their relationships are clearly drawn, and their dialogue is at once educated, revealing and lively. Part of the fascination of the play's first hour lies simply in the caliber of their verbal interaction. But the other part of it lies in the surprise twists Mr. Canfora has cooked up (which make discussion of the play's specifics difficult without revealing too much). The two he lets fly in the first act are both stunners. " However, it contends that the second act fell flat and urged Canfora to revise the second act, writing that in this incarnation the play was only a "glorious tease." He completed a rewrite of the play in March, 2010. The play had its Off-Broadway debut at 59E59 Theaters in February, 2012, starring Canadian actor Geraint Wyn-Davies. It received generally strong reviews. The New York Post wrote" It's hard to imagine that a crackling drama could revolve around a poet laureate's career. But Jack Canfora's “Poetic License” manages to render a tale of artistic ambition and hidden secrets with the breathlessness of a well-paced thriller." The Associated Press and Time Out New York offered similar praise, and the New York Times, while criticizing the plot's central premise, described it as "smartly written."

Abingdon Theatre named Canfora, on the strength of "Poetic License," the winner of the 2011 Christopher Brian Wolk award for playwriting.

The play was published in April, 2016 by Broadway Play Publishing Inc.

Jericho
His third play, Jericho, had a public staged reading at The Rattlestick Theatre in New York City on May 18, 2009. In October, 2010, The National New Play Network named Jericho," a finalist in their annual National New Play Network Festival. It was read at their convention in Denver, Colorado on December 4, 2010 at the Curious Theatre.

Following the reading in Denver, Jericho  was signed by four theaters to take part in a National New Play Network "Rolling World Premiere." Jericho premiered at the New Jersey Repertory Theatre in Long Branch, New Jersey on October 13th, 2011. It received generally highly positive reviews, with the New York Times stating "Mr. Canfora has delivered a smart, hard-hitting drama filled with biting wit."  The Newark Star Ledger wrote "Canfora's dialogue shows a true writer at work."

Its subsequent productions were at the Phoenix Theatre in Indianapolis in late October, 2011. The Indianapolis Star wrote that "The twisting journey to Jericho is worth it." The Florida Studio Theatre production opened April 4, 2012 and ran through June 9 as part of the 2011-2012 Mainstage Season. The play was also named to the Orlando Shakespeare Festival's prestigious "Playfest" reading series in April, 2011.''

The play ran Off Broadway at 59E59 Theaters from October, 4th, 2013, to November 3, 2013. It starred Jill Eikenberry and received strong review. The New York Times praised it especially, calling it "painfully significant, an intelligent intertwining of the nature of grief, cultural identity, fraught relationships and shared tragedy." 

It ran in Minnesota in April, 2015 and called "Brilliant" by the Star-Tribune 

It was published by Broadway Play Publishing Inc. in November, 2012. It is now in its second printing.

"The Small Time"
In 2015, Canfora co-created the web series "The Small Time," about a hapless literary agent whose only successful clients are his parents. The pilot was released in September, 2015 and won numerous honors, including a Webby Award in 2016 for "Best Writing."

Acoustic duo
Canfora occasionally performs as a singer and guitarist in the acoustic duo "Canfora & Koenig" with Rob Koenig.

References

External links
 Canfora & Koenig
 Website about A World With Snow
 Website about "Place Setting"

1969 births
Living people
20th-century American dramatists and playwrights